Louise Chevalier (1774 - died after 1801), was a French actor and opera singer. She was active in Russia in the French theater troupe of her spouse, the ballet dancer and playwright  (Pierre Peicam), from 1797 until 1801.

During her tenure in Russia, she was the lover of first the Master of the Stables, the court noble and emperor's favorite Ivan Kutaisov, and then of emperor Paul I of Russia. She was an important figure during the reign of Paul I, when she wielded great influence as a channel for supplicants to Kutaisov and the emperor, and reportedly accepted substantial sums as such, and attracted great animosity in St Petersburg.

After the fall of Paul I in March 1801, she was asked to leave Russia by tsar Alexander. It is not confirmed what happened to her after this, though conflicting reports place her as a courtesan and a spy in Paris, in Germany and in Poland.

References 
 Шевалье-Пейкам // Энциклопедический словарь Брокгауза и Ефрона : в 86 т. (82 т. и 4 доп.). — СПб., 1890—1907.

1774 births
19th-century deaths
19th-century French actresses
French stage actresses
19th-century actresses from the Russian Empire
Russian stage actresses
Mistresses of Paul of Russia
Date of death missing
18th-century French women opera singers